Charismania is a term used in criticism of the charismatic movement and the prosperity gospel. It is commonly used by more Conservative Christians and Evangelicalism. It criticizes and compares what the charismatics believe are gifts of the holy spirit to Mania or behavior characteristic of mental illness.

External links

 Charismania - A blog regarding experiences with Charismania.
 Charismania.org - A site concerning speaking in tongues.
 A Thin Line Between Faith & Denial - A Journey From Charismania Into The Unknown.

Charismatic and Pentecostal Christianity
Pejorative terms
Christian terminology